James Pritchett may refer to:

 James Pritchett (actor) (1922–2011), American actor
 James Pritchett (footballer) (born 1982), football player for New Zealand
 James Pigott Pritchett (1789–1868), British (York) architect
 James Pigott Pritchett junior (1830–1911), British (Darlington) architect